Stéphane Christidis (born 4 June 1981 in Nice) is a French sailor. In 2004, he competed in the men's 49er at the Olympic Games with team-mate Marc Audineau, finishing in 11th place.  Christidis then competed at the 2012 Summer Olympics in the 49er class with team-mate Emmanuel Dyen, finishing in 6th place.

References

External links 
 
 
 
 

1981 births
Living people
French male sailors (sport)
Olympic sailors of France
Sailors at the 2004 Summer Olympics – 49er
Sailors at the 2012 Summer Olympics – 49er
Sportspeople from Nice
Extreme Sailing Series sailors
21st-century French people